The EBF Bridge over Powder River is a bridge located near Leiter, Wyoming, which carries Sheridan County Road CN3-269 over the Powder River. The  bridge has two spans: the first span is a Pratt through truss, while the second span is a Warren truss. Due to this configuration, the bridge has been called "one of [Wyoming's] more interesting vehicular trusses." The trusses in the bridge are connected rigidly rather than by pins; the bridge was built in a transitional period between the two designs and is an early example of rigid connections. The Gregg & Stout Bridge Company of Sheridan built the bridge in 1915.

The bridge was added to the National Register of Historic Places on February 22, 1985. It was one of several bridges added to the National Register for its role in the history of Wyoming bridge construction.

See also
List of bridges documented by the Historic American Engineering Record in Wyoming

References

External links

Road bridges on the National Register of Historic Places in Wyoming
Bridges completed in 1915
Buildings and structures in Sheridan County, Wyoming
Historic American Engineering Record in Wyoming
National Register of Historic Places in Sheridan County, Wyoming
Pratt truss bridges in the United States
Metal bridges in the United States
Warren truss bridges in the United States